Navarchos Miaoulis ("Admiral Miaoulis") was a 1,820 ton Greek masted cruiser (in Greek termed Εύδρομο) named for the admiral Andreas Miaoulis, the leader of the Greek rebels' fleet during the Greek War of Independence (1821-1829).

Navarchos Miaoulis was built by Forges et Chantiers de la Méditerranée in France, and she was purchased by Greece as part of their program of naval expansion after the unsuccessful Cretan uprising of 1866. She was soon rendered operationally obsolete with the acquisition of newer, faster and larger ships such as the battleship  and was made into a training ship. She served on active duty in this capacity until decommissioned in 1931.

References

External links
 A History of Greek Military Equipment (1821-today): Miaoulis II

Cruisers of the Hellenic Navy
Cruisers of France
Ships built in France
1879 ships
World War I cruisers of Greece